The Fourth Federal Electoral District of the Federal District (IV Distrito Electoral Federal del Distrito Federal) is one of the 300 Electoral Districts into which Mexico is divided for the purpose of elections to the federal Chamber of Deputies and one of 27 such districts in the Federal District ("DF" or Mexico City).

It elects one deputy to the lower house of Congress for each three-year legislative period, by means of the first past the post system.

District territory
Under the 2005 districting scheme, the DF's Fourth District covers part of the centre and south of the borough (delegación) of Iztapalapa.

Previous districting schemes

1996–2005 district
Between 1996 and 2005, the Fourth  District covered the central portion of the borough of Gustavo A. Madero.

Deputies returned to Congress from this district

XL Legislature
 1946–1949: Alfonso Martínez Domínguez (PRI)
L Legislature
 1976–1979: Enrique Ramírez y Ramírez (PRI)
LI Legislature
 1979–1982: Rodolfo Siller Rodríguez (PRI)
LII Legislature
 1982–1985: Domingo Alapizco Jiménez (PRI)
LIII Legislature
 1985–1988:
LIV Legislature
 1988–1991: Jesús Anlen López (PRI)
LV Legislature
 1991–1994:
LVI Legislature
 1994–1997: Juan José Osorio Palacios (PRI)
LVII Legislature
 1997–2000: José de Jesús Martín del Campo (PRD)
LVIII Legislature
 2000–2003: José María Rivera Cabello (PAN)
LIX Legislature
 2003–2006: Rocío Sánchez Pérez (PRD)
LX Legislature
 2006–2009: Lourdes Alonso Flores (PRD)

References and notes

Federal electoral districts of Mexico
Mexico City